Feng Feng (born December 22, 1968) is a Chinese assistant coach and a retired football player.

Club career
Feng Feng would start his football career with the Bayi Football Team before he had the chance to join his hometown team Guangzhou Apollo in 1994. With his new team he would experience full professionalism and his most productive period of his whole career when he was part of the squad that came runners-up in the 1994 league title. After several further seasons without improving upon the runners-up position Feng was allowed to leave for Sichuan Quanxing and then nearing the end of the career he would decide to move to his wife's hometown of Chengdu where he joined second tier club Chengdu Wuniu where he eventually retired.

Coaching career
After he retired Feng would go to the United Kingdom and study in Sheffield to become a coach. When he finished he would gain a position at Sheffield United as an assistant coach of the youth team. When Sheffield United purchased one of Feng's previous clubs Chengdu Wuniu many expected his connections with the team would see him promoted to the Head coach position, however he took over the assistant coach of the renamed Chengdu Blades where he has remained despite seeing several other managers come and go. After a short spell in Shenzhen Ruby, Feng became the assistant coach of China League One side Guangdong Sunray Cave on 3 January 2013.

Honours
As a player

Guangzhou Apollo
Chinese Jia-A League Runner-up: 1994

References

External links
Player profile at sodasoccer.com

1968 births
Living people
Chinese footballers
People from Foshan
Footballers from Foshan
Bayi Football Team players
Guangzhou F.C. players
Sichuan Guancheng players
Chengdu Tiancheng F.C. players
Association football midfielders
Guangzhou City F.C. non-playing staff
Association football coaches